The Bruce Islands are a group of small islands and rocks  northwest of Eillium Island and  northwest of Route Point, the northwest tip of Laurie Island, in the South Orkney Islands. They were first roughly shown on Powell's chart resulting from the joint cruise of Captain George Powell and Captain Nathaniel Palmer in 1821. They were remapped in 1912–13 by Captain Petter Sorlle, and in 1933 by Discovery Investigations personnel on the RSS Discovery II, who named them for William S. Bruce, the leader of the Scottish National Antarctic Expedition, 1902–04.

See also 
 List of antarctic and sub-antarctic islands

References 

Islands of the South Orkney Islands